The Movie Game is a United Kingdom children's game show that ran from 8 June 1988 to 25 December 1995. The format is three teams of two players answering questions about films, the team with the fewest points at the end of the first round are eliminated. The other two teams moved on to a board game-style end game. The winning team could, depending on the points they earned, move on to the series final and the winner of that would win a film related prize such as meeting Steven Spielberg. Each show featured a celebrity guest.

Format
The show starts with three teams of two players in the colours Red, Green and Yellow. They first answer questions about film in a quick-fire round. They are then shown a clip from a film and are asked observation questions about the clip. Another quick-fire round followed this.  At the end of each of these rounds each team was shown one of three pictures which, combined, depicted a film, the team had to guess what film this was and were allowed to guess once the first two pictures had been revealed receiving bonus points if they guessed correctly with two pictures. Throughout the show the teams would be given a genre of film, a famous star, a prop and a sound effect. They would then be asked to write a short script and plot for a film which they would act out with relevant prop and sound effect. This would be marked out of ten by the audience.

The top two teams would move onto the end game. Originally it was a set of stairs in the style of a roll of film, this quickly changed to an ordinary board. The teams would move round the board answering questions. They could decide if they wanted to go 2, 3 or 4 spaces however they could only choose 4 spaces once as it was a special called Fast Forward.

The board had three special squares marked out with a door. When a team landed on one of these they would be transported to a mini game by the special effects. Only the first pair to make it to the special spaces would play the mini game.  If the game involved costumes the team would wear them around the rest of the board. The mini games always involved the celebrity guest. These were either action-based or required basic practical skill or knowledge related to the history of movie making. The theme was often based on the occupation of the celebrity guest.  They were marked out of ten for and the mark was added to their score.

The team that made it to the last space first won the game regardless of the points. Both finalist teams won a selection to prizes with the winning team winning the best prizes. The top 8 winners with the best scores during the series would compete in the final.

The series final had the same format but with 8 teams in the first round in the additions colours Orange, White, Puce, Tartan and Marzipan.

Transmissions

Original series

Specials

External links
 
 The Movie Game at BFI
 

1988 British television series debuts
1995 British television series endings
1980s British game shows
1990s British game shows
British children's game shows
1980s British children's television series
1990s British children's television series
BBC children's television shows